Thunder from Down Under is the third studio album by guitarist Frank Gambale, released in 1990 through Victor Entertainment and reissued on 24 April 2001 through Samson Records.

Critical reception

Alex Henderson at AllMusic gave Thunder from Down Under three stars out of five, listing "Samba di Somewhere", "Humid Beings" and "Mambojambo" as highlights.

Track listing

Personnel

Frank Gambale – vocals, guitar, keyboard (tracks 1, 4–7, 9–11), synthesizer (track 12), piano, electric percussion (track 7), mixing, production
Freddie Ravel – keyboard (tracks 1, 8)
Kei Akagi – synthesizer (track 1)
Chick Corea – Rhodes piano
Gregg Bissonette – drums (tracks 1, 2)
Joe Heredia – drums (tracks 3, 8, 9, 11)
Tom Brechtlein – drums (tracks 4, 10)
Vinnie Colaiuta – drums (tracks 5, 6)
Luis Conte – percussion (tracks 1, 3, 4, 6, 11)
Steve Kershisnik – bass (tracks 1, 2, 4, 9–11)
Tim Landers – bass (tracks 3, 6, 8)
Abraham Laboriel – bass (tracks 5, 7)
Steve Tavaglione – saxophone, EWI
Gary Grant – flugelhorn
Robert M. Biles – engineering, mixing
Wally Traugott – mastering
Akira Taguchi – executive production
Takashi Misu – executive production
Ron Moss – executive production

References

Notes

External links
In Review: Frank Gambale "Thunder From Down Under" at Guitar Nine Records

Frank Gambale albums
1990 albums
Victor Entertainment albums